The 1948–49 BAA season was the Stags' 3rd season in the NBA/BAA.

Draft

Roster

Regular season

Season standings

Record vs. opponents

Game log

Playoffs

West Division Semifinals
(2) Minneapolis Lakers vs. (3) Chicago Stags: Lakers win series 2-0
Game 1 @ Minneapolis: Minneapolis 84, Chicago 77
Game 2 @ Chicago: Minneapolis 101, Chicago 85

Last Playoff Meeting: This is the first meeting between the Lakers and Stags.

Awards and records
Max Zaslofsky, All-NBA First Team

References

Chicago Stags seasons
Chicago